Eulophonotus nigrodiscalis is a moth in the family Cossidae. It is found on São Tomé & Principe.

References

Natural History Museum Lepidoptera generic names catalog

Zeuzerinae